WFAZ (90.9 FM, "God's Country WFAZ") is an American non-commercial educational radio station licensed to serve the community Goodwater, AL and broadcasts from the city of Ashland in County, Alabama. The station currently carries Clay-Central Volunteer Athletics, local programming educational to listeners, Jacksonville State Gamecocks football, and Southern Gospel on Tuesday nights, Sunday mornings, and 5:30am–6:00am CST every weekday morning.

WFAZ broadcasts a Classic Country and Southern Gospel format.

The station was assigned the call sign "WFAZ" by the Federal Communications Commission (FCC) on August 18, 2010.

References

External links
WFAZ official website

Radio stations established in 2011
Contemporary Christian radio stations in the United States
Coosa County, Alabama
FAZ